Teldenia aurilinea is a moth in the family Drepanidae. It was described by Warren in 1922. It is found in New Guinea, where it is only known from the Arfak Mountains.

References

Moths described in 1922
Drepaninae